Benedict Taylor is a British avant-garde violist, violinist and composer.

Career
Taylor works in contemporary composition, modern string performance and improvised music in the British and European new music world. The central focus of his work is in new composition for live performance, film, theatre, contemporary dance, art installation, and electroacoustic composition.  In performance, he predominantly works within improvisation, new composition and 20th/21st century music.

Within his performance work there is a focus on solo performance as a creative and investigative process. In 2013 he initiated an ongoing commission series and solo label Subverten (For Viola Solo). The first works premiered in autumn 2013 and continue several times each year.

He has worked with a number of music organisations and ensembles including; clapTON Ensemble, re:sound, London Improvisers Orchestra, Berlin Improvisers Orchestra, Project Instrumental, Tokyo Improvisers Orchestra, Kammer Klang Players, Squib-Box, ARCO, London Sinfonietta Collective, Regular Music II.

Notable festival, venue and radio appearances include; Jazz en Nord Festival France, Tete a Tete Opera Festival, Aldeburgh Festival, Cantiere Internazionale d'Arte – Montepulciano, Huddersfield Contemporary Music Festival, Fete de la Musique Berlin, Manchester International Festival, Manchester Jazz Festival, Cheltenham Festival, BBC Radio 3, Resonance FM, Radio Libertaire/Epsilonia (Paris).

Personal life
He married Indian actress Radhika Apte in 2012.

Awards

Royal Philharmonic Society – Sir John Barbirolli Award (solo viola)
Lynn Foundation Scholarship (solo viola)
Westmorland Music Society Grant (solo viola)
Crystal Bear, Berlinale 2014 (Killa)
International Jury Special Mention, Berlinale 2014 (Killa)
Transylvania Trophy (Best Film) TIFF (Ship of Theseus)
Jury Special Mention BFI London Film Festival (Ship of Theseus)
London Film Critics Circle selection: Centenary Celebration – 15 life changing films (Ship of Theseus)
Grand Jury Award – New York SAIFF (The Bright Day)

Discography

Solo 
 SWARM for solo strings 
 Rend (ROAM Releases) solo violin 
 Solstice (Nachtstück Records) Benedict Taylor solo viola
 Caged Guerrillas (Subverten) - score and album for viola and distorted viola by Benedict Taylor 

 A Purposeless Play (Subverten) Benedict Taylor solo viola 
 Pugilism (Subverten) Benedict Taylor solo viola 
 Transit Check (CRAM) – Benedict Taylor, Solo Viola
Alluere (Subverten) Benedict Taylor, Solo Viola
 Striations (Subverten) – Benedict Taylor, Solo Viola

Collaborations 
 Landscapes - Paul Dunmall, Philip Gibbs, Benedict Taylor, Ashley John Long (FMR 2019)
 Close | Quarters (A New Wave of Jazz 2019) Benedict Taylor & Anton Mobin 
Rechtschaffen & Kales (ROAM 2019) Benedict Taylor, Tom Jackson, Chihiro Ono, Neil Luck 
 Puncture Cycle (A New Wave of Jazz) Benedict Taylor & Dirk Serries 
 Live at ZSenne Art Lab 11/10/18 (Roam) Tom Jackson & Benedict Taylor 
 Prossime Trascendenze (Amirani Records)
 Miya / Benedict + 7 Maestros: Live at Shinjuku Pit Inn Tokyo 2017 (Suon Records)
 Alex Ward Item 10 - Volition (Live at Cafe Oto) 
 In bed later, lying near the wall, his knees pulled up and his face resting on the striped ticking of the mattress, Leventhal went over his mistakes. (Roam) Tom Jackson & Benedict Taylor 
 TONUS: Texture Point (New Wave of Jazz) Dirk Serries, Martina Verhoeven, Benedict Taylor 
 Songs From Brightly-Lit Rooms (Squib Box) Tom Jackson & Benedict Taylor
 Hidden Bomba (Linear Obsessional) Chris Cundy & Benedict Taylor
 Four Quartets (Confront Recordings) Benedict Taylor, Tom Jackson, Keith Tippett, Ashley John Long
 Alexandertwatz in Berlin (Sardine Butty) Benedict Taylor & Stephen Crowe
 Hunt at the Brook (FMR) Benedict Taylor, Daniel Thompson & Tom Jackson
 Stow | Phasing (Raw Tonk) Benedict Taylor & Anton Mobin
 Gubbins - Benedict Taylor & Adam de la Cour 
 Burn Before Listening - The Rejected Recordings of Benny Court & Benny Taylor (Squib Box)
 Songs from Badly-Lit Rooms (Squib Box) – Tom Jackson & Benedict Taylor
 Dark Voices (CRAM) – Lawrence Upton & Benedict Taylor
 Guests on Tape – Anton Mobin & Benedict Taylor
 Une Nuit De Bruit (Sombre Soniks) – Benedict Taylor, Anton Mobin, Adio Lawal-West, Andrew Page, P23,Tim Drage
 Compost (CRAM) – Daniel Thompson, Alex Ward, Benedict Taylor
 The Long Half Day (Slightly Off Kilter) – Carousel Collective & Thomas Mindhouse
 Last Wayne Days (Squib Box) – Neil Luck, Fiona Bevan & Arco
 Lio, Leo, Leon (Emanem) – London Improvisers Orchestra
 Singing Marram III & IV (Subverten) – Benedict Taylor Solo Viola. Graphic scores Lawrence Upton

Composition

Solo 
 Sleepwalkers (film score)
 In Response to - concept album part 2 - release 2020
 To Whom It May Concern - concept album part 1 - release 2020
Ghost Stories
 Guerrillas in Boxes 
 One Jewish Boy (Stephen Laughton. Old Red Lion Theatre)
 Guerrillas 2018 - Nonclassical October 2018
 Young Hot Bloods (Longsight Theatre)
 The Hungry (Bornila Chatterjee. Film London 2017)
 Caged Guerrillas - for soloist or small ensemble. Score and album premiere Phantom Gallery Chicago 2017
 Guerrillas 2016 - for soloist or small ensemble. Premiere - Nonclassical October 2016
 Oysters (Pratyusha Gupta 2016)
 Mr Incredible (Camilla Whitehall. Dir - Sarah Meadows) 
 Where Do Little Birds Go (Camilla Whitehall. Dir - Sarah Meadows) 
 YOU (Mark Wilson. Dir - Sarah Meadows) Duck Down Theatre Company
 Fireworks (Dalia Taha. Dir - Richard Twyman) Royal Court Theatre 
 The Djinns of Eidgah (Abishek Majumdar. Dir - Richard Twyman) Royal Court Theatre
 The Bright Day (Mohit Takalkar)
 Maunraag (Vaibhav Abnave)
 Waves of Power (Rajesh Thind)
 Citizen Soldiers (Rajesh Thind)
 Our Stories: Living and Coping with Schizophrenia in India

Collaborations 
 Udta Punjab (2016) - Background score with Naren Chandavarkar
 Ghoul - Music Benedict Taylor & Naren Chandavarkar
 Balekempa 'The Bangle Seller' - Music Benedict Taylor & Naren Chandavarkar
 Newton - Music Benedict Taylor & Naren Chandavarkar
 Gurgaon Music – Benedict Taylor & Naren Chandavarkar
 Killa Music – Benedict Taylor & Naren Chandavarkar
 Ship of Theseus Music – Benedict Taylor & Naren Chandavarkar
 Harud Music – Benedict Taylor, Naren Chandavarkar, Suhaas Abuja
 That Girl in Yellow Boots Music – Benedict Taylor, Naren Chandavarkar & Suhaas Ahuja
 Butoh (Maria Guerberof). Music – Benedict Taylor & Alison Blunt
 The Dead Can Dance (Typewriters Collective). Music – Benedict Taylor & Alison Blunt
 Laal Kaptaan Background Scores - Benedict Taylor & Naren Chandavarkar
 Chintu Ka Birthday
 Searching for Sheela

References

1982 births
Living people
British classical musicians
British experimental musicians
Alumni of Goldsmiths, University of London